Rip Slyme (often stylized as RIP SLYME) is a Japanese hip hop group. In its best known incarnation, it was primarily composed of four MCs (Ryo-Z, Ilmari, Pes & Su) and a DJ, Fumiya. Pes and Su have since parted ways with the group. Their sound is influenced by old-school hip hop and other western rappers such as The Pharcyde, De La Soul, Public Enemy, Jurassic 5, the Beastie Boys, DJ Premier and Leaders of the New School.

During their career, they have released two indie albums, ten major albums, one live album, one indies collection, and three best-of albums. They released six singles as an indie act, and 17 with a major label.

On October 31, 2018 the group announced that they were suspending all activities. This announcement came six months after a tabloid alleged that Su was cheating on his wife and the group started conducting activities without him. Rip Slyme’s website has since shut down. Pes left the group as well in November 2017, but this was unknown to the general public until October 2021.

On April 15, 2022, Rip Slyme, now the trio of Ryo-Z, Ilmari & Fumiya, returned with the first of what was said to be five monthly singles, "Human Nature". This was followed by the next single, "Gentleman" on May 14, and the third, "After the rain" on June 17.

Members
 Ryo-Z: Ryouji Narita (成田亮治 Narita Ryouji), born July 15, 1974
 Ilmari: Keisuke Ogihara (荻原恵介 Ogihara Keisuke), b. June 17, 1975
 DJ Fumiya: Fumiya Takeuchi (竹内文也 Takeuchi Fumiya), b. March 14, 1979

Biography
The group was formed in 1994 by Ryo-Z and Ilmari, who were later joined by Pes (he attended the same school as Ilmari).  The Rip in Rip Slyme stands for their initials. Slyme was a popular children's toy at that time. Their name is also a pun on the phrase "lips' rhyme". Winning an amateur rapping contest "Young MCs In Town", they started their musical career with their first album Lips Rhyme in 1995. Later they added DJ Fumiya (who had studied under East End X Yuri's DJ Yoggy) and Su (previously a backup dancer for East End X Yuri). In 1998 they released their second album, "Talkin' Cheap" and also took part in Dragon Ash's Total Communication event.

Becoming more successful, they signed to Warner Music Group in 2000. By then they had released several indie singles including their EP "Underline No. 5" and "Mata Au Hi Made" which had received the help of Fantastic Plastic Machine. "Mata Au Hi Made" was released on Warner Music Group's Indies label. Their first major single was "Stepper's Delight" released 22 March 2001. The title was a play on The Sugarhill Gang's "Rapper's Delight".

In general, Fumiya composes most of the music, while Ryo-Z, Pes, Ilmari, and Su write their own lyrics. However, before Fumiya became a member, Pes composed most of the songs. Each member has tried their hand at composing music for Rip Slyme, and Pes occasionally played guitar on some tracks (Such as Home and More & More, for example). Allegedly, Pes was in a rock band before being introduced to hip hop music by Ilmari and Ryo-Z.

In 2002, they received MTV Video Music Awards Japan for "Best Newcomer" and "Best Hip-hop Group".

The same year they released a big-budget album "Tokyo Classic", which became Japan's first million-selling hip-hop album, with a sound compared to James Brown's soul and funk. Two singles from the album, "Funkastic" and "Rakuen Baby" collected MTV awards in 2003. "Super Shooter", featured as a B-side to their
single "Galaxy", is the theme song for the anime Gantz.

From late 2005 (after the release of Good Job! in August) through 2006, DJ Fumiya was on extended break, citing illness. For performances, a friend of the band, DJ Soma, was a stand-in. Fumiya's break led to several interesting side projects and collaborations from other members. Fumiya returned to activity for concerts in late summer 2006, and for the Rip Slyme release, Epoch.

On 7 July 2007, Rip Slyme performed their single "Nettaiya" at Live Earth in Kyoto, Japan. Later that year, they would go on to release their fifteenth major single, "Speed King", and their seventh Warner album, Funfair, shortly after.

In summer 2008, they released "Taiyou to Bikini". Later that year, three digital singles would debut, all of which would be on the February 2009 single "Stairs". Rip Slyme released their eighth album, Journey, on June 10, 2009.

Rip Slyme has provided voiceover work as well as the ending theme for an episode of the Japanese dub of SpongeBob SquarePants. The episode aired on May 6, 2009.

In 2010, Rip Slyme was one of the artists launched on Warner Music's new sublabel, unBORDE.

In October 2021, during the group's hiatus, Pes announced that he had quietly parted ways with Rip Slyme in November 2017 and stated that "a reunion would be difficult" due to the tensions he had with the other members.

Side projects
Ilmari formed a short lived group with Kj and BOTS of Dragon Ash, and Shigeo of Skebo King called Steady & Co. The group released their debut album Chambers in 2001. Ilmari and Ryo-Z along with Wise, Verbal of M-Flo, and Nigo the founder of A Bathing Ape formed a super group known as Teriyaki Boyz. The Teriyaki Boyz released two albums: Beef or Chicken (2005) and Serious Japanese (2009). In 2012 Ilmari formed a Hip-Hop/Rock band named The Beatmoss  with Kosen, Yas, and Sohnosuke. The group released two albums: The Beatmoss Vol. 1 (2012) and The Beatmoss Vol. 2 (2013). Pes released his first solo album, Suteki na Koto in 2012.

Discography

Talkin' Cheap (1998)
Five (2001)
Tokyo Classic (2002)
Time to Go (2003)
Masterpiece (2004)
Epoch (2006)
Funfair (2007)
Journey (2009)
Star (2011)
Golden Time (2013)
10 (2015)

Awards and nominations2002 MTV Video Music Awards Japan - Best Hip Hop Artist (Winner)
 MTV Video Music Awards Japan - Best New Artist (Winner)
 MTV Video Music Awards Japan - Best Live Performance2003 MTV Video Music Awards Japan - Video of the Year - Rakuen Baby (Winner)
 MTV Video Music Awards Japan - Best Group Video - Rakuen Baby (Winner)
 MTV Video Music Awards Japan - Best Hip Hop Video - Funktastic (Winner)
 MTV Video Music Awards Japan - Album of the Year - Tokyo Classic2004 MTV Video Music Awards Japan - Best Group Video - Joint
 MTV Video Music Awards Japan - Best Hip Hop Video - Joint
 MTV Video Music Awards Japan - Best buzzASIA Japan - Joint2006 MTV Video Music Awards Japan - Best Collaboration Video - Hotei x Rip Slyme - Battle Funkastic (Winner)2007 MTV Video Music Awards Japan - Best Collaboration Video - Quruli feat. Rip Slyme - Juice2008 MTV Video Music Awards Japan - Best Hip Hop Video - I.N.G (Winner)
 MTV Video Music Awards Japan - Best Group Video - I.N.G2009''
 MTV Video Music Awards Japan - Best Pop Video - Taiyou to Bikini

See also
Teriyaki Boyz
Dragon Ash
Steady & Co.
M-Flo
Rhymester
Fantastic Plastic Machine
East End X Yuri
Speed
Da Pump
Kaela Kimura

References

External links
 Official site
 Warner's Rip Slyme Page
 Rip Locks! Radio Show
 Metropolis.japantoday.com

Japanese hip hop groups
Japanese pop music groups
Musical groups established in 1994
1994 establishments in Japan
Musical groups from Kanagawa Prefecture
Japanese boy bands